Domenico Cambieri (19 September 1914 – 11 May 1988) was an Italian coxswain. He competed at the 1948 Summer Olympics in London with the men's coxed four where they were eliminated in the semi-final.

References

1914 births
1988 deaths
Italian male rowers
Olympic rowers of Italy
Rowers at the 1948 Summer Olympics
Rowers at the 1952 Summer Olympics
Sportspeople from the Province of Bergamo
Coxswains (rowing)
European Rowing Championships medalists